Bontu Rebitu (born 12 December 1997) is a Bahraini long-distance runner. She competed in the women's 5000 metres at the 2017 World Championships in Athletics.

References

External links

1997 births
Living people
Bahraini female long-distance runners
World Athletics Championships athletes for Bahrain
Place of birth missing (living people)
Athletes (track and field) at the 2018 Asian Games
Asian Games medalists in athletics (track and field)
Asian Games bronze medalists for Bahrain
Medalists at the 2018 Asian Games
20th-century Bahraini people
21st-century Bahraini people
Islamic Solidarity Games medalists in athletics